Die Komiker is a German television series in Bavarian dialect.

See also
List of German television series

External links
 

German comedy television series
Television shows set in Bavaria
1999 German television series debuts
2000s German television series
2010s German television series
German-language television shows
Das Erste original programming